Leucothoe davisiae is a species of flowering plant in the family Ericaceae known by the common name Sierra laurel.

It is native to California in the Sierra Nevada and the Klamath Mountains, in which its distribution extends just into southwestern Oregon.

Description
Leucothoe davisiae is a shrub growing in wet mountain habitat, such as bogs. This shrub grows erect, exceeding one meter in height. Its leathery, hairless oval leaves are 1 to 6 centimeters long and evergreen.

The inflorescence is a hanging cluster of many small urn-shaped white flowers, not unlike those of manzanitas. The bloom period is June to August.

The fruit is a capsule about half a centimeter long containing many tiny winged seeds.

External links
Calflora Datafbase: Leucothoe davisiae (Sierra laurel)
Jepson Manual eFlora (TJM2) treatment
USDA Plants Profile
UC Photos gallery

Vaccinioideae
Flora of California
Flora of Oregon
Flora of the Klamath Mountains
Flora of the Sierra Nevada (United States)
Flora without expected TNC conservation status